Chipley High School is a public high school located at 1545 Brickyard Road in Chipley, Florida. Previously, the school was located on 2nd Street until 2000, when the present school was built on Brickyard Road. Spanish Trail Playhouse is located there today. The school's teams compete as the Tigers. Chipley High School dress code restrictions are addressed in the student handbook and there is no required school uniform. It is part of the Washington County School District in Washington County, Florida.

Athletics at Chipley High School include football, boys’ and girls’ basketball, baseball, volleyball, golf, girls weightlifting, softball, cross country, and track. 
Chipley Boys Basketball won State Championships in 2016, 2015, and 2012.  State Runner Up 1989.
Chipley Football was state runner-up in 2011.

Notable people
NBA hall of famer Artis Gilmore transferred from Roulhac High School to Chipley for one week before moving to George Washington Carver High School in Dothan, Alabama 
Alex Hamilton (born 1993), basketball player for Hapoel Eilat in the Israeli Basketball Premier League
Amp Lee, RB Florida State, professional football player, 1997 Team MVP for the Rams.
Trent Forrest, professional basketball player, point guard Florida State
Karsten Whitson, professional baseball player, drafted ninth overall in the 2010 MLB draft by the San Diego Padres

References

External links
Chipley High School website

Educational institutions in the United States with year of establishment missing
Public high schools in Florida
Schools in Washington County, Florida